"Attention" is a song by Nigerian singer Omah Lay and Canadian singer Justin Bieber. It was released through Sire Records and KeyQaad as the second single from Lay's debut studio album, Boy Alone, on 4 March 2022. The song was produced by Avedon and Harv. "Attention" was Lay's first charting song.

Background
Lay was in the studio with producer Harv in Los Angeles, California. When he heard the instrumental, he came up with the lyrics to the song. Harv connected with Bieber on FaceTime and played the song for him. Bieber then sent his vocals to Lay. Lay felt that the best part about collaborating with Bieber "was how easy it was" and he "didn't even expect it to be that simple".

Composition and lyrics
"Attention" is an afrobeats song that is set in the key of F minor with a tempo of 120 beats per minute. Bieber opens the song up with the first verse, which sees him use his lower register. Lyrically, the two artists address the loneliness of a one-sided relationship and also wonder if they should use drugs and alcohol to ease the pain.

Release and promotion
The song was released for streaming and download on 4 March 2022. Four days later, it was pushed to radio airplay.

Critical reception
Jon Pareles of The New York Times felt that Bieber's "restrained croon dovetails nicely with the equanimity of Afrobeats singers".

Music video
The official music video for "Attention", directed by Colin Tilley, premiered on Bieber's YouTube channel on 4 March 2022. It sees Lay and Bieber around a bonfire, surrounded by women, in which they dance with them and sing the song.

Credits and personnel

 Omah Lay – vocals, songwriting
 Justin Bieber – vocals, songwriting
 Avedon – production, songwriting, bass, keyboards, drums
 Harv – production, songwriting
 Felisha King-Harvey – songwriting
 Josh Gudwin – mixing, vocal production, vocal engineering
 Heidi Wang – mixing assistance
 Colin Leonard – mastering
 Mark Parfitt – vocal engineering
 Denis Kosiak – engineering, additional engineering

Charts

Weekly charts

Year-end charts

Certifications

Release history

References

2022 singles
2022 songs
Omah Lay songs
Justin Bieber songs
Music videos directed by Colin Tilley
Sire Records singles
Song recordings produced by Harv
Songs written by Harv
Songs written by Justin Bieber
Songs written by Omah Lay
Warner Records singles